Alejandro Federico Lerner (born June 8, 1957) is an Argentine musician and singer-songwriter. He has written and sung countless songs including several hits, and his fame and recognition spread all over South America.

Through his career, Lerner played in different bands, formed his own group, and worked with international artists such as Luis Miguel, Paul Anka, and Celine Dion.

Lerner was born in Buenos Aires to a family of Ashkenazi Jewish origin.  In 1974, he was discovered by Raúl Porchetto, who invited him to join a short-term project called Reino de Munt. In 1977, Lerner participated in Gustavo Santaolalla's band Soluna. In addition, Alejandro Lerner was consolidating his skills as a performer while working with well-known Argentine singers Leon Gieco and Sandra Mihanovich.

In 1981, Lerner formed a band called la Magia, playing along with bass player Hernán Magiano, guitarist Damián Figueroa, saxophonist Oscar Kreimer, and drummer Luis Querón, releasing Alejandro Lerner y La Magia in 1982. A year later, the band broke up and he decided to start his solo career, releasing Todo a Pulmón that same year and Lerner Tres in 1984.
In 1998, Alejandor Lerner recorded the theme "Paths of the Soul" next to Kennedy Choir[2] and with more than 120 Argentine artists under the direction of Instrumental pianist and conductor Nazareno Andorno. 
In 1999, a compilation of his greatest hits, called 20 Años (20 Years), was released.

In 2002, Lerner gained exposure in the US when he collaborated with Carlos Santana on the song "Hoy Es Adiós" which was released on Santana's album Shaman. In 2021 both artists collaborated again on the single "Puro Sentimiento", which was remixed in 2022 with Sofía Reyes and L-Gante.

Discography

1970s
1979 Sus primeras canciones

1980s
1982 Alejandro Lerner y la Magia
1983 Todo a pulmón
1984 Lernertres
1985 Conciertos
1987 Algo que decir
1988 Canciones

1990s
1990 Entrelíneas
1992 Amor infinito
1994 Permiso de volar
1995 La magia continúa
1997 Magic hotel
1997 Volver a empezar
1999 20 años

2000s
2000 Si quieres saber quién soy
2002 Lerner vivo
2003 Buen viaje
2006 Canciones para gente niña
2007 Enojado
2008 "EN VIVO EN EL GRAN REX CD Y DVD"
2016 "Autentico"

References

External links
Official Website
Official Website

1957 births
Jewish Argentine musicians
Living people
Musicians from Buenos Aires
Argentine songwriters
Male songwriters
Latin music songwriters